The 2008 U.S. Olympic gymnastics team trials were held from June 19 to 22, 2008, at the Wachovia Center (now known as Wells Fargo Center) in Philadelphia.

Venue 
The Wachovia Center, which has a capacity of up to 20,478 spectators, is home to the Philadelphia Flyers, Philadelphia 76ers, and the Philadelphia Wings.

Participants 
The 13 national team gymnasts were invited to attend:

The following people were also invited to Olympic trials:

Broadcast 
NBC broadcast all nights of competition at the trials.

Results

Final standings

Final scores
Full Olympic trial scores are as follows:

Olympic team selection 
At the conclusion of the Olympic trials only Shawn Johnson and Nastia Liukin were named to the team to represent the USA at the 2008 Summer Olympics.  The remaining members of the team were to be determined after a selection camp; attendees included: Jana Bieger, Chelsea Davis, Ivana Hong, Mattie Larson, Corrie Lothrop, Chellsie Memmel, Samantha Peszek, Alicia Sacramone, Bridget Sloan, and Shayla Worley.  The camp concluded in mid-July with Memmel, Peszek, Sacramone, and Sloan being named to the team while Bieger, Hong, and Lothrop were named as the alternates.

References 

United States Olympic trials
2008 in sports in Pennsylvania
Gymnastics at the 2008 Summer Olympics
Gymnastics